Grey Island Systems International was a provider of 'real-time' Internet-based GPS/AVL and passenger information solutions targeted to government and enterprise fleets. Its InterFleet and NextBus brands were independently launched commercially in 1998. It was acquired by WebTech Wireless Inc. in 2009.

Headquartered in Toronto, with over 55 employees in offices around North America, Grey Island has garnered recognition from Industry groups such as the Profit 100, Canada’s Fastest Growing Companies (2005–2007) and Deloitte and Touche Technology Fast 50 (2006–2008).

InterFleet 

InterFleet was launched commercially in 1998 with an EMS (Emergency Medical Services) client, tracking ambulances every 100 meters of vehicle travel. This translated into the industry leading vehicle average update rate of 6 to 10 reports per minute. InterFleet’s patented live screen map thus displays the entire fleet and automatically refreshes updated status changes every second. Its applications have primarily been focused on public sector fleet tracking, and most of its users are state/provincial and local governments.

The InterFleet on-board GPS/AVL hardware and firmware as well as the middleware and end-user software is typically customized for each clients particular needs. It provides a broad variety of machine-to-machine and sensor integrations, allowing for application development to be focused on specific fleet management operation concerns, i.e. fuel costs, winter maintenance operations, government regulations, etc.

NextBus 

NextBus uses Global Positioning System (GPS) tracking satellites and advanced computer modeling to track vehicles in their routes, thus providing accurate vehicle arrival information and real-time maps instead of bus schedules to passengers and managers of public transit, shuttles, and trains. The information is updated at regular intervals to account for traffic variations, breakdowns, and day-to-day problems faced by transit providers that can interrupt service.

In addition, NextBus provides transit riders access to the information over the internet, via wireless devices such as PDAs and cell phones, through IVR (interactive voice response), and at electronic signs at specific bus stops.

Senior management team 

 Andrew Moore, Chief Executive Officer and Co-founder
 Owen Moore, President and Co-Founder
 Brian Boychuk, Executive Vice-President, Business Development and Marketing and Co-founder
 Chris Madden, Chief Financial Officer
 Alban Hoxha, Vice-President Software
 Jerry Dellacorte, Vice-President, InterFleet, Inc.
 Saleem Ahmed, Vice-President, Manufacturing
 Lillian Chan, Chief Operating Officer, NextBus, Inc.
 John Eaton, Chief Financial Officer, NextBus, Inc

Products 

 Day of the Zombie - Released on 6 March 2009
 Marine Sharpshooter IV: Locked and Loaded - Released on 28 July 2008
 Playboy the Mansion: Private Party - Released in 2007
 Marine Sharpshooter 3 - Released on 28 May 2007
 LA Street Racing - Released on 28 May 2007
 Close Quarters Conflict - Released on 22 January 2007
 World War II Combat: Iwo Jima - Released on 21 July 2006
 Warpath - Released on 18 July 2006
 World War II Combat: Road to Berlin - Released on 24 January 2006
 Military Action Pack: Volume 1 - Released on 25 October 2005

See also 

 NextBus
 InterFleet

References

External links 

 Grey Island Official Website
 NextBus Real-Time Arrivals
 Interfleet Inc. - U.S. Operating Company

Defunct software companies of Canada
Companies based in Toronto
1998 establishments in Canada
2019 disestablishments in Canada
Software companies established in 1998
Companies established in 1998
Software companies disestablished in 2019